Mastigothrips is a genus of thrips in the family Phlaeothripidae.

Species
 Mastigothrips fuscus
 Mastigothrips karnyianus

References

Phlaeothripidae
Thrips
Thrips genera